Nîmes Olympique (commonly referred to as simply Nîmes) is a French association football club based in Nîmes. The club was founded on 10 April 1937 and currently plays in Ligue 2, the second level of French football. The  is the club’s home stadium.

History
In the 1995–96 season, Nîmes reached the final of the Coupe de France, allowing them to compete the following year in the UEFA Cup Winners' Cup. In September 1996, in the Round of 32, Nîmes beat Budapest Honvéd (4–1 on aggregate), before losing to AIK Stockholm in the next round (2–3 on aggregate).

On 5 May 2018, Nîmes secured promotion back to Ligue 1 for the first time since the 1992–93 season after finishing second in Ligue 2. In the 2018–19 season, Nimes finished comfortably above the relegation zone in Ligue 1, placing 9th among 20 teams.

On 5 November 2022, Nîmes played its final match at the Stade des Costières, a 1–0 Ligue 2 victory over Bordeaux.

Players

Current squad

Reserve squad

Notable players
Below are the notable former players who have represented Nîmes in league and international competition since the club's foundation in 1937. To appear in the section below, a player must have played in at least 80 official matches for the club or represented the national team for which the player is eligible during his stint with Nîmes or following his departure.

For a complete list of Nîmes Olympique players, see :Category:Nîmes Olympique players

Coaches

Honours
Ligue 1
Runners-up: 1958, 1959, 1960, 1972
Ligue 2
Champions: 1950
Runners-up: 2018
Championnat National
Champions: 1997, 2012
Coupe de France
Runners-up: 1958, 1961, 1996
Trophée des Champions
Runners-up: 1958
Coppa delle Alpi
Champions: 1972
Coupe Drago
Runners-up: 1956
Coupe Gambardella
Champions: 1961, 1966, 1969, 1977

References

External links

 

 
Association football clubs established in 1937
1937 establishments in France
Sport in Nîmes
Football clubs in Occitania (administrative region)
Ligue 1 clubs